Adi Shilon (born 10 December 1987) is an Israeli radio presenter, actress and television host. She is the daughter of Dan Shilon.

Biography 
Adi Shilon was born in Tel Aviv, Israel, to an Ashkenazi Jewish family. Her parents, Dan Shilon (formerly Shulkis) and Miri Shilon (née Tzivion), were popular Israeli television personalities. Adi's uncle Yigal Shilon is an Israeli television and film director.

In 2018, she married Arab-Israeli actor Yousef "Joe" Sweid. Their daughter was born in October 2019. They reside mostly in Berlin, Germany.

Media career 
She began her media career on Hai from Tel Aviv, a daily program show in 2010. She has also produced radio programs such as The Little Man from the Radio, The Morning show and Lev Tel Aviv.

See also
Television in Israel
Radio in Israel

References

External links 
 Profile at IMDb
 

1987 births
Living people
Israeli film actresses
Israeli television presenters
Israeli women television presenters
Israeli radio presenters
Israeli women radio presenters
People from Tel Aviv
Israeli people of Romanian-Jewish descent
Israeli Ashkenazi Jews